Olry may refer to:

Jean-Claude Olry (born 1949), French slalom canoeist who competed in the late 1960s and early 1970s
Jean-Louis Olry (born 1946), French slalom canoeist who competed in the late 1960s and early 1970s
Olry Terquem (1782–1862), French mathematician who proved Feuerbach's theorem about the nine-point circle of a triangle
Port Olry, Francophone town (population 1300) on Espiritu Santo island in the Sanma Province of Vanuatu
René Olry CLH (1880–1944), French general and commander of the Army of the Alps during the Battle of France of World War II